The 1973 ICF Canoe Slalom World Championships were held in Muotathal, Switzerland under the auspices of International Canoe Federation. It was the 13th edition. A record nine nations won medals at the championships.

Medal summary

Men's

Canoe

Kayak

Mixed

Canoe

Women's

Kayak

Medals table

References

External links
International Canoe Federation

Canoe
ICF Canoe Slalom World Championships
International sports competitions hosted by Switzerland
Icf Canoe Slalom World Championships, 1973